NJ-LUSO Parma is an American soccer team based in Denville, New Jersey, United States. Founded in 2007, the team plays in the USL Premier Development League (PDL), the fourth tier of the American Soccer Pyramid, in the Mid Atlantic Division of the Eastern Conference.

The team plays its home games in the stadium on the campus of Morris Catholic High School, where they have played since 2008. The team's colors are navy blue and white.

The team also fields a team in the USL's Super-20 League, a league for players 17 to 20 years of age run under the United Soccer Leagues umbrella.

History
The Rangers began their life in the PDL in a positive frame of mind under head coach Ken Cherry, but immediately found the going tough. They lost their debut game 4–1 at home to fellow expansion franchise Newark Ironbound Express, and were demolished 8–1 in their very next game at home to Ocean City Barons; coach Cherry started his third goalkeeper in three games against Westchester Flames, and although fortunes improved, they still lost 1–0, and found themselves languishing at the bottom of the divisional standings. The Rangers finally picked up their first win of the season in early June, 1–0 over Hampton Roads Piranhas off a goal by Adam Kelemet, but continued to struggle thereafter, losing their next four successive games, including a 4–0 walloping at the hands of Brooklyn Knights. The Rangers picked up their second (and final) win of the year the first weekend in July, 2–0 over Long Island Rough Riders, and were unlucky to come out on the losing end of a 7-goal thriller away in Brooklyn the following week, but faded weakly as the season ended, conceding another 6 goals in a heavy defeat to the Long Island Rough Riders in their penultimate game. The Rangers eventually finished 6th of 6 in the Northeast Division, 26 points behind divisional champions Brooklyn; testament to their lack of stability is the fact that head coach Cherry used 40 different players in the team's 16 games. Dritan Sela was top scorer, with 4 goals on the season.

Players

Current roster
As of December 6, 2016.

Notable former players
This list of notable former players comprises players who went on to play professional soccer after playing for the team in the Premier Development League, or those who previously played professionally before joining the team.

  Bolu Akinyode
  John Borrajo
  Dilly Duka
  Samuel Petrone
  Dominic Reinold

Year-by-year

Head coaches
  Jimmy Dontas (2017)
  Juan Pincay (2017)

Stadia
 Stadium at Morris Catholic High School; Denville, New Jersey (2008–present)

Average attendance
Attendance stats are calculated by averaging each team's self-reported home attendances from the historical match archive at https://web.archive.org/web/20131208011525/http://www.uslsoccer.com/history/index_E.html.

 2008: 150
 2009: 60
 2010: 101

References

External links
Official Site
Official PDL site

Association football clubs established in 2007
USL League Two teams
Soccer clubs in New Jersey
2007 establishments in New Jersey